Ddebo is a populated place in Alindao, Basse-Kotto, Central African Republic.

References

Populated places in Basse-Kotto